The United St. Maarten Party (US Party) is a political party in Sint Maarten founded in 2013 by former National Alliance deputy leader  Frans Richardson. The party currently holds one seat in the Parliament of Sint Maarten. In the 2014 general elections, the party obtained 2 seats. However, their then (MP)-elect Leona Marlin-Romeo left the US Party and became an independent member of parliament.

In the 2020 elections they again won 2 seats.

References

Political parties in Sint Maarten
Political parties established in 2013
2013 establishments in Sint Maarten